Henry Street is located on Dublin's Northside and is one of the two principal shopping streets of Dublin (the other being Grafton Street).

Location 
Henry Street runs from the Spire of Dublin and the General Post Office on O'Connell Street in the east to Liffey Street in the west. At Liffey Street, the street becomes Mary Street, which continues the shopping street until it ends at crossing Capel Street. Henry Street and Mary Street are often considered as one (and in fact form a single shopping area with their eastward continuations, beyond the Spire, North Earl Street and Talbot Street).

Henry Street is connected to Princes Street North by the GPO Arcade.

History 

The land around Dublin's Northside was the original part of the estate of St Mary's Abbey. It was given to James FitzGerald, 13th Earl of Desmond following the Dissolution of the Irish monasteries in 1537. The street was developed by Henry Moore, 1st Earl of Drogheda in 1614, whose estate lands and developments are reflected in the street names bearing his name, Henry Street, Moore Street, Earl Street, Of Lane and Drogheda Street. Most of those names still survive, but what was Drogheda Street is now O'Connell Street, Dublin's main street. The area was later sold to Luke Gardiner in the early 1700s. Of or Off Lane is now known as Henry Place. The street was shown on Charles Brooking's map of Dublin, published in 1728.

Properties began to be developed along Henry Street in the 1760s, with a variety of businesses and shops. There are now none of the original Georgian properties left. The street was pedestrianised in the 1980s. The flagship Arnotts store is at nos. 9-15 Henry Street, and has been based there since 1843. The current name dates from 1865. The original buildings were extensively destroyed by fire in 1894. Many buildings on the street were damaged or destroyed during the 1916 Easter Rising and only two 19th century properties survived - Arnotts at Bos. 9-15 and No. 6. Rebuilding took place soon afterwards, with several buildings constructed from concrete or brick. Nos. 27-30 were removed to accommodate the extension of the General Post Office building on O'Connell Street in the 1920s.

A Roches Stores department store was established on the corner of Henry Street and Coles Lane in 1960. The premises were redeveloped in 2003.

The Ilac Centre began construction in 1977. As well as an entrance on Henry Street, it linked it to Parnell Street and Moore Street. It was refurbished in 2006 at a cost of €60 million.

Buskers, including musicians, poets and mime artists, commonly perform to the shopping crowds. Street preachers are also a common sight.

See also
 List of upscale shopping districts
 List of streets and squares in Dublin

References

Sources

External links

Buildings of Henry Street, from Archiseek

Streets in Dublin (city)
Busking venues
Shopping districts and streets in Ireland
Pedestrian malls in Ireland